"Friend of Mine" is a song by Canadian alternative rock band Treble Charger. It was released in May 1997 as the lead single from the band's third studio album, Maybe It's Me. The song was used by ESPN as the theme music for the 1997 X Games Wakeboarding Championship.

Charts

References

External links

1997 singles
Treble Charger songs
1997 songs